The great piebald horned toad (Atympanophrys gigantica), or giant spadefoot toad, is a species of frog in the family Megophryidae, endemic to China. It is known only from Jingdong Yi Autonomous County and Yongde County in southwestern Yunnan.
Its natural habitats are subtropical or tropical moist montane forests and rivers.
It is threatened by habitat loss.

References

Atympanophrys
Amphibians of China
Endemic fauna of Yunnan
Taxonomy articles created by Polbot
Amphibians described in 1960